The 60mm HVMS (High Velocity Medium Support) gun is a self-loading autocannon jointly developed by OTO Melara of Italy and the Israel Military Industries (IMI). It was designed to be mounted on light armoured vehicles to provide an anti-armour capability using high-velocity sub-calibre kinetic ammunition.

Overview
The gun was designed for infantry support, to give infantry units increased anti-armour firepower through a powerful but light gun mounted on light vehicles deployed with these units. 

The project commenced in 1977, originally as a joint development between Israeli Military Industries (IMI) and OTO Melara of Italy, whereby IMI were expected to develop the gun and ammunition, and OTO Melara the autoloader and a lightweight two-man turret which could be mounted on a variety of different vehicles. However, for reasons unknown, both companies went their own way and developed their own versions, although they each retained the same cartridge case dimensions. The IMI version is known as the High-Velocity Medium Support (HVMS) gun while the OTO Melara version is known as the High Velocity Gun System (HVGS).

Despite being judged a success by IMI, the gun did not enter service with Israel and the only export sale was in 1983 to Chile, to upgrade M24 Chaffee and M-50 Super Sherman tanks. OTO Melara's version was proposed for fitment to a variant of the Italian Army's Dardo infantry fighting vehicle (which the company co-developed with Iveco), but as of 2021 this proposal does not seem to have eventuated.

Design
The barrel is fabricated using the autofrettage method to allow the wall to be thin but extremely strong. A hydro-spring recoil system employs a spring surrounding the breach-end of the barrel which is protected by a shroud and a truncated rubber sleeve, allowing quick barrel changes as the gun and recoil system can be removed/installed as a single unit.

Although originally designed with an automatic loading system, the gun can also be manually loaded. The automatic loader is recoil-operated and features a vertical magazine with capacity differing between the IMI and OTO Melara versions. Rounds can be fired individually or in a three-round burst, or in the case of the OTO Melera version, in full automatic with a maximum rate of fire of 30 rounds per minute. Manual loading consists of the traditional method of inserting the shells into the vertically-sliding breach by hand, augmented by hydraulic assistance. Manually loaded, the rate of fire is up to 12 rounds per minute with a reloading time of three seconds between firings. Firing is by an electrically-actuated system.

The gun was originally designed to be installed in the T60/70 turret, a lightweight two-man turret which also contained a 7.62mm machine gun and four electronically-operated smoke dischargers mounted on each side. The turret could be fitted to a number of light armoured vehicles, and was trialled by the IDF on the M113 armoured personnel carrier, and by Italy in the Fiat Type 6616 4x4 armoured car. However, this turret did not do into production and operational vehicles which received the gun (such as those of the Chilean army) had it fitted to existing turrets modified accordingly.

The gun can fire both armour-piercing fin-stabilised discarding sabot -tracer (APFSDS-T) and high explosive (HE) 60x640R ammunition. An inert training round is also available.

Performance

For testing, the gun was fitted to a British QF 6-pounder gun carriage and fired against static Russian T-62 range targets.

This performance bettered that of APDS rounds fired from the Royal Ordnance L7 105mm gun.

Vehicles fitted with the gun
The gun was mounted on the following vehicles in either a prototype or demonstration, or operational capacity:

 B1 Centauro wheeled tank destroyer (prototype only)
 BWP-2000 infantry fighting vehicle (prototype only)
 Dardo infantry fighting vehicle / C13-60 light tank / VCC-80 (prototype only)
 Fiat Type 6616 armoured car (prototype only)
 M24 Chaffee light tank
 M41 Walker Bulldog light tank
 M-60 Sherman medium tank
 Marder infantry fighting vehicle (prototype only)
 M113 armoured personnel carrier (prototype only)
 MOWAG Piranha IB 6×6 wheeled infantry fighting vehicle (prototype only)
 VBM Freccia wheeled infantry fighting vehicle (prototype only)

Operators
 Chilean Army: from 1983 fitted to M24 Chaffee and M-50 Sherman tanks, which were then known as the M-60 Sherman. It is believed that when the M24s were withdrawn from service in the early 2000s, some guns were fitted to M41 Walker Bulldogs (at least one prototype was created). At least one Piranha 6x6 IFV was trialled with the gun fitted.  As of 2022 it is uncertain as to whether any vehicles armed with this gun remain in service.

Specifications

Ammunition
The following specifications are for APFSDS-T ammunition:
 weight:
 complete round: 
 projectile: 
 sub-projectile:
 length:
 complete round: 
 projectile: 
 sub-projectile diameter:
 muzzle velocity:  

The following specifications are for HE ammunition:
 weight:
 complete round: 
 projectile: 
 length: 
 muzzle velocity: 
 fuse: point detonating, base detonating, proximity and delayed

Gun
The following specifications are for the gun assembly (i.e. barrel and breech), less mounts:
 bore: 60mm
 calibers: 70
 length: 
 weight:
 IMI: 
 OTO: 
 recoil system: hydro-spring
 recoil force: 
 recoil travel: 
 rifling: right hand, 22 grooves, 1 in 30 turns per calibres
 firing: electrical
 firing modes: single shot, burst, full auto
 max. rate of fire: 30 rounds per minute

Turret
The following specifications are for the T60/70 turret originally designed to house the gun:

 material: aluminium
 length: 
 width: 
 height above turret ring: 
 depth below turret ring: 
 weight:
 without gun: 
 fitted and loaded: 
 elevation: electrically operated, -6 to +50 degrees
 traverse: electrically operated, 360 degrees
 sight magnifications:
 gunner's: x8
 commander's: x2.5, x10
 power supply: 24V
 crew: 2

A manual version (i.e. non-electrically operated) version was also available.

Notes

References

Tank guns of Israel
Tank guns of Italy
60 mm artillery
Military equipment introduced in the 1970s